Devdas is a 1965 Pakistani Drama movie directed by Khawaja Sarfaraz, based on the Sharat Chandra Chattopadhyay famous Bengali novel Devdas from 1917. It starred Habib, Shamim Ara and Nayyar Sultana in lead roles supported by Asad Bukhari, Azad, Ajmal, Maya Devi and Razia. Sultan Rahi appears in the film as an extra.

Plot summary
After his wealthy family prevent him from marrying the woman he is in love with, Devdas' (Habib) life spirals more and more out of control as he takes up alcohol and a life of vice to relieve the pain.

Cast
 Shamim Ara as Parvati
 Habib as Devdas
 Nayyar Sultana as Chandramukhi
 Asad Bukhari
 Azad, Ajmal
 Maya Devi
 Razia
 Sultan Rahi

Soundtrack
Lyrics are written by Qateel Shafai and Roop Baivt and the music is composed by Akhtar Hussain.

 "Bairi, Akhian Na Kehna Mora Manay" sung by Naseem Begum
 "Dil Mein Koi Aas Nahin" sung by Saleem Raza
 "Kya Mangen, Is Dunya Say" sung by Saleem Raza
 "Maan Bhi Ja Gori" sung by Naheed Niazi
 "Manzil Apni Door O, Sathi" sung by Ahmed Rushdi
 "Mori Pooja Kay Phool Murjhaye" sung by Kausar Perveen
 "Nacho, Nacho, Manwa Moray" sung by Irene Perveen
 "Ruk Ja, O Bewafa" sung by Kausar Perveen
 "Taskeen Jo Day Jatay" sung by Saleem Raza
 "Theis Lagati Hay Yeh Dunya" sung by Naseem Begum

References

External links 
 

1965 films
Devdas films
1965 romantic drama films
Pakistani romantic drama films
1960s Urdu-language films
Films scored by Akhtar Hussain
Urdu-language Pakistani films